Transportation Center Skopje is the main city bus and railway station in the Republic of North Macedonia capital Skopje. It was built after the 1963 Skopje earthquake that destroyed the Original station buildings. The station is served by Long-distance trains to Belgrade, Thessaloniki, Athens and Ljubljana, and Express routes to Thessaloniki, via Vienna that serve Skopje twice daily, once going to Thessaloniki and second time returning to Vienna, passing through Belgrade and Ljubljana. The Skopje railway station is 15 min walking from the main square Makedonija.

History
The station was built following the 1963 Skopje earthquake that hit on 26 July 1963 which destroyed the Original station buildings. The old station building has become a symbol of the earthquake, with the clock stopped at 5.17 and now houses the Museum of the City of Skopje (Muzej na grad Skopje). After the earthquake, a project was started for a major reconstruction of the city, authored by Kenzo Tange, a Japanese architect, but which has not been fully implemented. The station was rebuilt in the Brutalist style of architecture. It was completed in 1981.

Services
The main north–south line from Niš in Serbia to the port of Thessaloniki in Greece on the Aegean Sea (Corridor X), passes Skopje. Intercity trains link Skopje with, Kumanovo, Zelenikovo, Veles, Negotino (Kavadarci), Demir Kapija, Miravci (Valandovo) and Gevgelija (Bogdanci) with Serbian Railways and Greek railways. Connections to Bulgarian State Railways are via Niš in Serbia and via Thessaloniki in Greece. Intercity trains from Kosovo Railways link Skopje with Pristina.

Gallery

References 

Skopje
Skopje
Transport in Skopje
Buildings and structures in Skopje